Citrus Blast is a caffeine-free, grapefruit-citrus flavored soft drink produced by PepsiCo.

Packaging
Citrus blast comes in 12-ounce aluminum cans, 20-ounce plastic bottles, and 2-liter plastic bottles. The plastic bottles are light-green tinted. The label has a yellow background and the text in the logo is red. On the top left-hand corner, there is a light blue banner with the words "New!" printed in white. On the top right-hand corner, there are the capitalized words "CAFFEINE FREE" printed in small, regular font.

Ingredients
The ingredients of Citrus Blast are:

Carbonated water, high fructose corn syrup, citric acid, grapefruit juice concentrate, modified food starch, sodium citrate, sodium benzoate (preserves freshness), glycerol ester of rosin, natural flavor, potassium sorbate (preserves freshness), calcium disodium EDTA

A 20-ounce bottle contains 240 calories, 64 grams carbs, and 64 grams of sugars.

Varieties
 Citrus Blast (2011–Present) - The original flavor. A light yellow-green-colored, grapefruit-citrus-flavored soda that was developed in 2011 by PepsiCo to compete with Squirt, a similar grapefruit soda from The Dr. Pepper Snapple Group.
 Diet Citrus Blast (2011) - Reduced-calorie Citrus Blast. It was introduced shortly after the regular version of Citrus Blast. It is available in various parts of the United States.

References
Review: Citrus Blast-Grapefruit-flavored Squirt knockoff from Pepsi 
The official Citrus Blast website 
Citrus Blast product facts 
NEW! Naturally Flavored and Caffeine Free soda called Citrus Blast 
Citrus Blast review by SODACRAZY 
X-Entertainment review of Citrus Blast 

PepsiCo soft drinks
Grapefruit sodas

da:Citrus Blast